The Supermarine S.5 was a 1920s British single-engined single-seat racing seaplane built by Supermarine. Designed specifically for the Schneider Trophy competition, the S.5 was the progenitor of a line of racing aircraft that ultimately led to the Supermarine Spitfire.

Design and development
The Supermarine S.5 was designed by Reginald Mitchell for the 1927 Schneider Trophy. Following the earlier loss of the S.4 before the 1925 Schneider Trophy event Mitchell designed a new  monoplane racer. Unlike the S.4's all-wood structure, the S.5 was of mixed construction with the semi-monocoque fuselage, including the engine cowlings, mainly duralumin; the wire-braced wings had spruce spars and spruce-ply ribs and a plywood skin. The horizontal tail surfaces were made of wood.  Wing surface radiators made up of corrugated copper sheets replaced the Lamblin type radiators of the S.4.: oil was cooled by corrugated steel radiators on either side of the fuselage.  The entire fuel load was carried in the starboard float , which was eight inches (20cm) further from the aircraft's centreline than the port float. Three aircraft were built, one with a direct drive 900 hp (671 kW) Napier Lion VIIA engine, and the other two with a geared 875 hp (652 kW) Napier Lion VIIB engine.

Operational history
The first aircraft flew for the first time on 7 June 1927. The S.5s came 1st and 2nd in the 1927 race held at Venice, the winning aircraft (Serial number N220) was flown by Flight Lieutenant Sidney Webster at an average speed of 281.66 mph (453.28 km/h).

One S.5, N221, crashed on 12 March 1928 during an attempt on the world air speed record, killing the pilot Flight Lieutenant Samuel Kinkead, who had flown the Gloster IV in the 1927 Schneider Trophy Race.

Concern over the unreliability of the supercharged Lion powering the Gloster VI led to the High Speed Flight entering one S.5 (N219, fitted with a geared Lion engine for the event) along with the two S.6s for the 1931 Schneider contest. The S.5,  flown by Flight Lieutenant D'Arcy Greig finished third in 46 minutes 15 seconds at a speed of 282.11 mph (454.20 km/h), behind the winning S.6 flown by Flying Officer H. Richard Waghorn and a Macchi M.52.

Replica
Ray Hilborne of Leisure Sports designed and built a full-scale S.5 replica which flew for the first time on 28 August 1975. The replica, powered by a Continental IO-360, used an all-wood construction and incorporated modifications to the wing to lower the stalling speed, water rudders, a slightly wider cockpit and overall weight reduction to an all-up weight of just 1,500 lb, less than 1/2 that of the S.5.

Popular culture
In the song "Bill Hosie" by Archie Fisher, the protagonist rebuilds an S.5 Supermarine that survived the 1927 Schneider Trophy Race. The aircraft, race, and trophy are referred to throughout the song.

Operators

 Royal Air Force
 High Speed Flight

Specifications (N220)

See also

References
 Notes

Bibliography

 Andrews, C.F. and E.B. Morgan. Supermarine Aircraft since 1914, 2nd edition. London: Putnam, 1987. .
 Green, William, ed. "Supermarine's Schneider Seaplanes." Flying Review International, Volume 10, No. 11, July 1967.
 Hall, John. "Supreme Supermarine." Aeroplane Monthly, Volume 4, No. 11, November 1976.
 The Illustrated Encyclopedia of Aircraft (Part Work 1982–1985). London: Orbis Publishing, 1985.
 Jackson, A.J. British Civil Aircraft since 1919. London: Putnam, 1988. .
 Lewis, Julian. Racing Ace - The Fights and Flights of 'Kink' Kinkead DSO DSC* DFC*. Barnsley, UK: Pen & Sword, 2011. .
 Lumsden, Alec and Terry Heffernan. "Per Mare Probare, Part 15," Aeroplane Monthly, Volume 17, No. 5, May 1989.
 Shelton, John. Schneider Trophy to Spitfire - The Design Career of R.J. Mitchell.  Yeovil, UK: Haynes Publishing, 2008. .

External links

 Profile - The Schneider Trophy winning Supermarine S.5 - Aeroplane Monthly
 1927 Schneider Trophy
 Supermarine S.5—A British Legend Reborn, the project to build a replica S.5 for the centenary of the 1927 contest

Schneider Trophy
1920s British sport aircraft
Floatplanes
S.5
Low-wing aircraft
Single-engined tractor aircraft
Aircraft first flown in 1927